SIRA may refer to:

 Stable Isotope Ratio Analysis
 Section 115 Reform Act of 2006
 SIMPLE IRA